N'Gangoro is a village in central Ivory Coast. It is in the sub-prefecture of Tiébissou, Tiébissou Department, Bélier Region, Lacs District.

Until 2002, N'Gangoro was in the commune of N'Gangoro-Attouto. In March 2012, N'Gangoro-Attouto became one of 1126 communes nationwide that were abolished.

Notes

Populated places in Lacs District
Populated places in Bélier